Marko Matvere (born 4 February 1968) is an Estonian actor and singer. He was the lead actor of the Tallinn City Theatre, but left to become a freelance actor in 2004.

Biography

Matvere was born in Pärnu and graduated from the Tallinn Conservatory (now the Estonian Academy of Music and Theatre) in 1990. He is married to Tiina Matvere and they have a daughter, Matilde, and a son, Oskar.

Matvere has performed in many musicals, including Les Misérables, Tanz der Vampire, The Sound of Music, and Miss Saigon. He has performed the main role in several films ("Georg) and television series. He hosted the Eurovision Song Contest 2002 with Annely Peebo. He has also hosted the TV show Songs with Stars with Karin Rask. He has been a member of the music group "Väikeste lõõtspillide ühing" ("Association of Little Accordions") since 1989 and released two albums with Jaan Tätte.

He made his first movie appearance in Suflöör (1993). Matvere has played or voiced in a number of and television series including foreign television series.

Recognition 
Marko has been awarded with the First Prize in the category of young actors at the International Theatre Festival in Torun in 1992, the Estonian Theatre Union Award in 1996, the award for Best Actor in 1997 at the National Drama Festival, and the Tallinn City Theatre Collegiate awards of Best Actor in 1995, 1996, 1998, and 1999.

Filmography

Films

Television

See also
List of Eurovision Song Contest presenters

References

External links

Estonian male stage actors
Estonian male voice actors
Estonian male film actors
Estonian male musical theatre actors
Estonian male television actors
21st-century Estonian male singers
1968 births
Living people
People from Pärnu
20th-century Estonian male actors
21st-century Estonian male actors
Estonian Academy of Music and Theatre alumni
Recipients of the Order of the White Star, 5th Class